Statistics of Allsvenskan in season 1970.

Overview
The league was contested by 12 teams, with Malmö FF winning the championship.
In August, young Hammarby IF supporters began to stand and sing songs with own-written lyrics. This is seen as the beginning of modern organized soccer chants in Sweden. Inspirationens came from England through Tipsextra in SVT.
Örebro SK defeated defending champions IFK Göteborg, 1-0, at home at Eyravallen in the final game, leading to IFK Göteborg being relegated. Riots began when IFK Göteborg supporters stormed the pitch in an attempt to tear down the goal in order to make sure the game would be replayed. The game was cancelled with circa eight minutes left, and IFK Göteborg was relegated.

League table

Results

Footnotes

References 

Allsvenskan seasons
Swed
Swed
1